was Director of the Karafuto Agency (1929–1931). He was Governor of Yamagata Prefecture (1922–1924), Kagoshima Prefecture (1924–1926), Chiba Prefecture (1926–1927), Gunma Prefecture (1927–1928), Osaka (1932–1935) and Mayor of Nagoya (1939 – January 6, 1942). He was from Shizuoka Prefecture. He was a graduate of the University of Tokyo. He died in office while serving as mayor of Nagoya.

1881 births
1942 deaths
Governors of Yamagata Prefecture
Governors of Kagoshima Prefecture
Governors of Chiba Prefecture
Governors of Gunma Prefecture
Directors of the Karafuto Agency
Governors of Osaka
Mayors of Nagoya
University of Tokyo alumni
Politicians from Shizuoka Prefecture
Japanese Home Ministry government officials